Agios Chariton ( "Saint Chariton";  "Ergenekon", previously ) is a small village in Cyprus. Agios Chariton is under the de facto control of Northern Cyprus. As of 2011, it had a population of 96. It has historically been a Turkish Cypriot village.

References

Communities in Famagusta District
Populated places in Gazimağusa District